Coëtlogon (Gallo: Cotlagon) is a commune in the Côtes-d'Armor department of Brittany in northwestern France.

Toponymy
The name Coëtlogon is typically Breton, "koad" meaning "wood" with the lieu-dit "Logon".

Population

Inhabitants of Coëtlogon are called Logonais or Coëtlogonnais in French.

See also
Communes of the Côtes-d'Armor department

References

Communes of Côtes-d'Armor